The North Carolina House of Representatives is one of the two houses of the North Carolina General Assembly. The House is a 120-member body led by a Speaker of the House, who holds powers similar to those of the President pro-tem in the North Carolina Senate.

The qualifications to be a member of the House are found in the state Constitution: "Each Representative, at the time of his election, shall be a qualified voter of the State, and shall have resided in the district for which he is chosen for one year immediately preceding his election." Elsewhere, the constitution specifies that qualified voters that are 21 are eligible for candidacy except if otherwise disqualified by the constitution, and that no elected officials may deny the existence of God, although the latter provision is no longer enforced, as it would be illegal to do so.

Prior to the Constitution of 1868, the lower house of the North Carolina Legislature was known as the North Carolina House of Commons.

Partisan composition

Officers (2023–24 session)

Members (2023–24 session)

↑: Member was first appointed to office.
Source: NC General Assembly official site

Past composition of the House of Representatives

See also
North Carolina Senate

References

External links
Official House site
Project Vote Smart – State House of North Carolina

 

 
State lower houses in the United States